Events from the year 1585 in art.

Events
Approximate start date of Flemish Baroque painting.
March 3 - The Teatro Olimpico, Vicenza, designed by Palladio, and completed by Vincenzo Scamozzi, is opened, with trompe-l'œil scenery in one-point perspective.
The Eclectic Academy of painting, also called the Accademia degli Incamminati, is founded in Bologna by Ludovico Carracci and others.
French cardinal Matthieu Cointrel (Contarelli in Italian) dies, leaving an endowment and instructions for the decoration of the Contarelli Chapel in Rome.

Works

Pietro Francavilla – Saturn Devouring one of his Sons (sculpture)
El Greco
St. Dominic in Prayer
The Virgin of the Immaculate Conception and St. John
Nicholas Hilliard - Portrait miniature of Sir Walter Ralegh
Taddeo Landini - Statue of Pope Sixtus V (now destroyed)
Paolo Veronese - Lucretia
John White – Indian Village of Secoton

Births
January - Hendrick Avercamp, Dutch painter (died 1634)
May 17 (bapt.) - Esaias van de Velde, Dutch landscape painter (died 1630)
June 28 - Sisto Badalocchio, Italian painter and engraver of the Bolognese School (died 1647)
July 7 - Thomas Howard, 21st Earl of Arundel, English art collector (died 1646)
August 25 - Giovanni Biliverti, Italian Mannerist painter (died 1644)
date unknown
Arent Arentsz, Dutch painter (died 1631)
Sir Nathaniel Bacon, English landowner and painter of kitchen and market scenes with large vegetables, fruit, and buxom maids (died 1627)
Boetius à Bolswert, Dutch engraver (died 1633)
Isaac Briot, French engraver and draughtsman (died 1670)
Angelo Caroselli, Italian painter of the Baroque period (died 1652)
Huang Daozhou, Chinese calligrapher, scholar and official of the Ming Dynasty (died 1646)
Lan Ying, Chinese painter of landscapes, human figures, flowers and birds during the Ming Dynasty (died 1664)
John Taylor, English portrait painter (died 1651)
Jacob van Geel, Dutch Golden Age painter (died 1648)
Ottavio Vannini, Italian painter of altarpieces and churches, active mainly in Florence (died 1643)
Giuseppe Vermiglio, Caravaggisti painter from Northern Italy (died 1635)
Wen Zhenheng, Chinese Ming dynasty scholar, painter, and landscape garden designer (died 1645)

Deaths
September 6 - Luca Cambiasi, Italian painter (born 1527)
December 19 - Wenzel Jamnitzer, Northern Mannerist goldsmith, artist, and printmaker in etching (born 1507/1508)
date unknown
Giuseppe Marullo, Italian painter (date of birth unknown)
Adamo Scultori, Italian engraver (born 1530)
Francisco de Holanda, Portuguese humanist and painter (born 1517)
probable - Jacob de Backer, Flemish Mannerist painter and draughtsman (born 1555)

 
Years of the 16th century in art